Phoenicia dessert is a type of Lebanese/Syrian cookie. The dessert was named after the ancient Phoenicians.

Preparation
The cookie is made using flour, baking powder, orange juice, and oil.  No dairy products are used. After baking in the oven, the Phoenicia dessert are rolled in a mixture of cinnamon, sugar and ground walnuts. Hurma, another type of Lebanese, Syrian, Levant and Turkish cuisine dessert, are made with the same ingredients, but after baking, they are dipped into a syrup mixture consisting of sugar, honey, water, orange zest, and cloves.  Then they are rolled in the ground walnut, sugar and cinnamon mixture.

See also
Şekerpare
Revani
Baklava
Tulumba

References

Arab cuisine
Lebanese cuisine
Lebanese desserts
Syrian cuisine
Cookies
Levantine cuisine